Voskhod is a closed urban locality (a settlement) in Moscow Oblast, Russia. It was formerly called Novopetrovsk-2. Population:

Overview
It is located near the Moscow-Volokolamsk highway and the Novorozhdestvensky Forest, and was involved in the November 1941 Battle of Moscow between Germany and the Soviet Union.

Administrative and municipal status
Within the administrative divisions framework, it is incorporated as the closed administrative-territorial formation of Voskhod—an administrative unit with the status equal to that of the districts. As a municipal division, the closed administrative-territorial formation of Voskhod is incorporated as Voskhod Urban Okrug.

References

Notes

Sources

Urban-type settlements in Moscow Oblast
Closed cities